Fred Thelonious Baker (born 4 June 1960) is an English guitarist and jazz bass guitarist from Tibshelf, Derbyshire. He is known for playing in Phil Miller's Canterbury scene band In Cahoots.

Baker played the guitar until his mid-teens, at which point he began to take an interest in the bass as well. He played in The John Etheridge/Ric Sanders Group in the early 1980s. He has also worked with his own group, the Fred Thelonious Baker Group who recorded a self-titled album in 1984. Baker has recorded several albums with Harry Beckett. They have also made a concert tour in Europe together. Baker accompanied Beckett's band on a Charles Mingus tribute tour in the UK. Other artists Baker has worked with include Horace Parlan, Vikki Clayton and Elton Dean.

Baker joined In Cahoots in April 1988, replacing their bassist Hugh Hopper. He has toured and recorded six albums with them, and remains a key member of the band. He also works as a teacher at Birmingham Conservatoire and The University of Huddersfield.

Discography

References

External links
Calyx profile
1999 Interview with Baker from Calyx

1960 births
Living people
English bass guitarists
English male guitarists
Male bass guitarists
Place of birth missing (living people)
Canterbury scene
British jazz bass guitarists
People from Tibshelf
Alumni of Birmingham Conservatoire
In Cahoots members
British male jazz musicians
2nd Vision members